Edward Ball (10 February 1859 – 31 July 1917) was an English cricketer who played for Gloucestershire. He was born in Clifton, Bristol and died in Tonbridge, Kent.

Ball made three first-class appearances for Gloucestershire between the 1880 and 1881 season, but failed to score a single run in the three innings in which he batted.

Ball was an accounts clerk and stayed in that area of employment until his death.

External links
Edward Ball at Cricket Archive 

1859 births
1917 deaths
English cricketers
Gloucestershire cricketers
Cricketers from Bristol